Inés Molina is an Argentine film  and television actress. Sometimes she is credited as Inés Molina Villafañe.

She works in the cinema of Argentina.

Filmography
 Sur (1989) aka The South
 El Viaje (1993) aka The Journey
 Buenos Aires Vice Versa (1996)
 The Other (2007) aka El Otro

Television
 Déjate querer (1995) TV Series aka Let Me Love You

External links
 
 

Argentine film actresses
Year of birth missing (living people)
Living people
Place of birth missing (living people)